The 1994 NCAA Division I baseball season, play of college baseball in the United States organized by the National Collegiate Athletic Association (NCAA) began in the spring of 1994.  The season progressed through the regular season and concluded with the 1994 College World Series.  The College World Series, held for the forty eighth time in 1994, consisted of one team from each of eight regional competitions and was held in Omaha, Nebraska, at Johnny Rosenblatt Stadium as a double-elimination tournament.  Oklahoma claimed the championship for the second time.

Realignment
Florida Atlantic joined the Trans America Athletic Conference after reclassifying from NCAA Division II.

Conference winners
This is a partial list of conference champions from the 1994 season.  The NCAA sponsored regional competitions to determine the College World Series participants.  Each of the eight regionals consisted of six teams competing in double-elimination tournaments, with the winners advancing to Omaha.  In order to provide all conference champions with an automatic bid, 12 conference champions participated in a play-in round.  The six winners joined the other 18 conference champions with automatic bids, 24 teams earned at-large selections.

Conference standings
The following is an incomplete list of conference standings:

College World Series

The 1994 season marked the forty eighth NCAA Baseball Tournament, which culminated with the eight team College World Series.  The College World Series was held in Omaha, Nebraska.  The eight teams played a double-elimination format, with Oklahoma claiming their second championship with a 13–5 win over Georgia Tech in the final.

Bracket

Award winners

All-America team

References